Stanton Family Cemetery is a historic cemetery located at Buckingham County, Virginia. It is an African-American rural cemetery with approximately 36 burials.  The graves are marked with headstones and footstones of irregularly shaped slabs of local Buckingham slate.  The stones mark the graves of at least four generations of the Stanton family.

It was listed on the National Register of Historic Places in 1993.

References

African-American history of Virginia
Cemeteries on the National Register of Historic Places in Virginia
Buckingham County, Virginia
National Register of Historic Places in Buckingham County, Virginia